The 33rd Indian Infantry Brigade was an infantry brigade of the British Indian Army that saw active service in the Indian Army during the Second World War, notably in the Burma Campaign.

History
The 33rd Indian Infantry Brigade was formed in October 1941, at Campbellpore in India. The brigade was assigned to the 7th Indian Infantry Division until July 1942, when it was attached to the North Western Army. It returned to the 7th Division in December 1942, and took part in the Burma Campaign. Between April and May 1944, it was corps reserve for XXXIII Indian Corps and was attached to the 5th Indian Infantry Division in March 1945. The rest of the war it was under 7th Division command.

Order of battle
The brigade included the following units:
4th Battalion, 5th Gurkha Rifles October 1941 to January 1944	
4th Battalion, 10th Gurkha Rifles October to December 1941
4th Battalion, 15th Punjab Regiment April 1942 to August 1945
4th Battalion, 8th Gurkha Rifles May to October 1942
4th Battalion, 1st Gurkha Rifles February 1944 to August 1945
1st Battalion, Queen's Royal Regiment (West Surrey) December 1942 to September 1944 and April to August 1945
1st Battalion, 11th Sikh Regiment March to April 1944
1st Battalion, Burma Regiment May 1944 to April 1945
2nd Battalion, South Lancashire Regiment February 1945
2nd Battalion, 8th Punjab Regiment May 1945
1st Battalion, 19th Hyderabad Regiment May 1945

Commanders
The brigade had the following commanders in the Second World War:

See also

 List of Indian Army Brigades in World War II

References

Bibliography

External links
 

Brigades of India in World War II
Military units and formations established in 1941
Military units and formations disestablished in 1946
Military units and formations in Burma in World War II